Game of Death II, also known as Tower of Death or The New Game of Death, is a 1981 Hong Kong martial arts film directed by Ng See-yuen and starring Bruce Lee, Tong Lung, Huong Cheng Li and Roy Horan. This film was marketed as a sequel to Bruce Lee's last and only partially completed film Game of Death. Bruce Lee died some years before the production of Game of Death II and most of his scenes are taken from Lee's older films, mostly Enter the Dragon.  Aside from the international English dub giving the "Bruce Lee" character the name Billy Lo, this movie appears to have no connection with Robert Clouse's 1978 version of Game of Death.

Plot
After a recent number of challenges, Billy Lo (Bruce Lee) and his friend Chin Ku (Huong Cheng Li) begin to suspect that someone wants them dead. Billy later visits his younger brother Bobby (Tong Lung), who is studying with Billy's former teacher, and leaves him a book on Jeet Kune Do. Chin is soon killed and Billy goes to Japan to find his stepdaughter, May. May tells him that Chin had visited just before his death, and left a film for her. They are suddenly attacked, but Billy manages to escape with the film.

A few days later Billy attends Chin's funeral, where he is turned away from viewing the body. A helicopter arrives during the burial and steals the coffin away. Trying to prevent the theft, Billy is carried up with the casket but falls to his death. Bobby Lo is told of Billy's death by their father, who tells him to find a man named Sherman Lan and avenge his brother. Sherman gives him the film, which shows Chin Ku at the Palace of Death. The Palace of Death is run by a crazed martial arts expert by the name of Lewis (Roy Horan). Any challenger who fails to defeat Lewis is fed to his pack of lions. Bobby decides to meet Lewis, who is impressed with Bobby's abilities. While investigating the Palace, Bobby is attacked by a masked man. Then he informs Lewis that someone is trying to kill him. Later that night, a woman is sent to Bobby's room to seduce and assassinate him. When she fails, one of Lewis' lions attacks Bobby. During the fight, the masked man appears and kills Lewis.

Suspecting Lewis' valet, Bobby seeks him out at the Fan Yu temple, where the underground Tower of Death is rumored to be. After defeating the valet, Bobby spies the secret entrance into the tower. Battling his way through the tower he eventually confronts the operator, Chin Ku. Chin is the head of a global drug trafficking organization and staged his own death to throw off Interpol investigators. He tried to frame Lewis for his death and arranged for the coffin to be stolen to prevent it from being searched. Realizing the only way to defeat Chin's sword skills is with Billy's Jeet Kune Do, Bobby cold-heartedly uses Chin's sword, impales Chin's bodyguard monk (Lee Hoi-San) and Chin together, finally killing Chin and stopping his drug operation.

Deleted scenes
Deleted scenes are available on DVD in both the international and English version as a special feature in Hong Kong Legends. One particular scene in the Chinese version of Game of Death, directed by Sammo Hung, was intended for his Asian audiences. In the Chinese version, Hung replaced the action scene in the opera house with another scene from the glasshouse at night with Casanova Wong in his karate clothes. The new fight scene, particularly the flips between Tong Lung and Yuen Biao, is reminiscent of Bruce Lee's fighting style.

Versions
Much like the original Game of Death, there are several versions of Game of Death II.
 The first main version is the original Hong Kong version, titled Tower of Death (死亡塔). Most of this version's music was sourced from Les Baxter's score for The Dunwich Horror. This was approximately 86 minutes long, and is the version used in the U.K. Hong Kong Legends DVD.
 The second main version is the international English-dubbed version, retitled as Game of Death II. This does not remove any footage, but instead uses Bruce Lee and Lee-related stock footage to create new scenes, the most prominent being the above-mentioned greenhouse fight with Casanova Wong. Other scenes include a childhood montage of Billy Lo, taken from Lee's childhood films, and a funeral dedication, which uses footage from Bruce Lee's real funeral. However, it is done more tastefully than its use in Game of Death, since it appears as more of a real tribute to Lee than a movie funeral. The international version also includes a proper end credits montage. This version is more widely available than the original version, even appearing in the Hong Kong Bruce Lee Ultimate Collection DVD set.
 The third version is an extremely rare official South Korean print of the film. This uses more footage of the Korean actors Kim Tai-chung and Hwang Jang-lee (including an extended version of the sword demonstration with Hwang's character), while downplaying the Bruce Lee angle by cutting most of the stock footage of Lee.

Cast
 Bruce Lee as Lee Chen-chiang (李振強) / Billy Lo (盧比利) in English dub (stock footage)	
 Kim Tai-chung as Lee Chen-kwok (李振國) / Bobby Lo (盧博比) in English dub (doubling for Bruce Lee) (credited as Tong Lung)
 Hwang Jang-lee as Chin Ku (credited as Huong Cheng Li)
 Roy Horan as Lewis (credited as Roy Haron)
 Roy Chiao as The Abbot
 Ho Lee Yan as Billy's Father
 Casanova Wong as the Korean Martial Artist (Lau Yea-chun)
 To Wai-Wo as Lewis' Servant	
 Hoi Sang Lee as the Bald Monk
 Mars as Guard in the Cave	
 Miranda Austin as Angel
 Tiger Yang as Strongman in Leopard Suit	
 Yuen Biao as Blue Staff Monk
 Bolo Yeung as the Guard

Soundtracks
 Dancer - performed by Gino Soccio (only in Cantonese/Mandarin versions)
 Jealousy - performed by Amii Stewart (only in Korean theatrical version)

Box office
In Hong Kong, the film grossed 1,950,391. In South Korea, the film's 2016 re-release grossed  in Seoul City, adding up to at least  grossed in East Asia.

Home media

DVD releases
Universe (Hong Kong)
 Aspect ratio: widescreen (2:35:1) letterboxed
 Sound: Cantonese (Dolby Digital 5.1), Mandarin (Dolby Digital 5.1)
 Subtitles: Traditional, Simplified Chinese, English, Japanese, Indonesian, Malaysian, Thai, Korean, Vietnamese
 Supplements: stars' files, trailer, trailers for The Big Boss, Enter the Dragon, Game of Death and Legacy of Rage
 All regions, NTSC

Fortune Star – Bruce Lee Ultimate DVD Collection (Hong Kong)
 Released: 29 April 2004
 Aspect ratio: widescreen (2:35:1) anamorphic
 Sound: English (DTS 5.1), English (Dolby Digital 5.1), English (2.0 Mono)
 Subtitles: Traditional, Simplified Chinese, English
 Supplements: original trailer, new trailer, celebrity interviews, still photos, slideshow of photos, Game of Death outtakes, unseen footage, Enter the Dragon alternative opening credits, 32-page booklet
 Region 3, NTSC

Fox (America)
 Released: 25 May 2005
 Aspect ratio: widescreen (2:35:1) anamorphic
 Sound: English (DTS 5.1), English (Dolby Digital 5.1)
 Subtitles: English
 Supplements: Original trailer, new trailer, bonus trailers
 Region 1, NTSC

Fox – Bruce Lee Ultimate Collection (America)
 Released: 18 October 2005
 Aspect ratio: widescreen (2:35:1) anamorphic
 Sound: English (DTS 5.1), English (Dolby Digital 5.1), English (Dolby Digital 2.0 Mono)
 Subtitles: English
 Supplements: original trailer, new trailer, Game of Death outtakes, bonus trailers, still photos, slideshow of photos
 Region 1, NTSC

Hong Kong Legends (United Kingdom)
 Released: 5 November 2001
 Aspect ratio: widescreen (2:35:1) anamorphic
 Sound: Cantonese (Dolby Digital 2.0 Surround), English (Dolby Digital 2.0 Surround)
 Subtitles: English, Dutch
 Supplements: commentary by Bey Logan and Roy Horan, original trailer, HKL promotional trailer, biography showcases, bonus trailers, interviews with actors Casanova Wong and Roy Horan, deleted scenes (in English)
 Regions 2/4, PAL

See also
 List of Hong Kong films

References

External links

 

1981 action films
1981 films
1981 martial arts films
Bruceploitation films
Cantonese-language films
Game of Death
Golden Harvest films
Hong Kong films about revenge
Hong Kong martial arts films
Hong Kong sequel films
Kung fu films
Martial arts films
1980s Hong Kong films